Darlington railway station is on the East Coast Main Line in the United Kingdom, serving the town of Darlington, County Durham. Its three-letter station code is DAR.

The station is well served, since it is an important stop for main line services, with trains being operated by London North Eastern Railway, CrossCountry and TransPennine Express, and it is the interchange for Northern services to Bishop Auckland,  and Saltburn.
Darlington is the location of the first commercial steam railway: the Stockton and Darlington Railway. The station building is a Grade II* listed Victorian structure and winner of the "Large Station of the Year" award in 2005.

History
The first railway to pass through the area now occupied by the station was built by the Stockton and Darlington Railway, who opened their mineral branch from Albert Hill Junction on their main line to Croft-on-Tees on 27 October 1829. This branch line was subsequently purchased by the Great North of England Railway a decade later to incorporate into their new main line from York which reached the town on 30 March 1841. A separate company, the Newcastle & Darlington Junction Railway continued the new main line northwards towards Ferryhill and Newcastle, opening its route three years later on 19 June 1844. This crossed the S&D at Parkgate Junction by means of a flat crossing which would in future years become something of an operational headache for the North Eastern Railway and LNER. The original Bank Top station where the two routes met was a modest affair, which was rebuilt in 1860 to accommodate the expanding levels of traffic on the main line. By the mid-1880s even this replacement structure was deemed inadequate and so the NER embarked on a major upgrade to facilities in the area.  This included an ornate new station with an impressive three-span overall roof on the Bank Top site, new sidings and goods lines alongside it and a new connecting line from the south end of the station (Polam Junction) to meet the original S&D line towards Middlesbrough at Oak Tree Junction near . These improvements were completed on 1 July 1887, when the old route west of Oak Tree closed to passengers (although it remained in use for freight until 1967).  

The new station, with its broad island platform was designed by T. E. Harrison, chief engineer, and William Bell, the architect of the North Eastern Railway. It cost £81,000 to construct.

The lines to Penrith (closed in 1962), Barnard Castle (1964) and Richmond (1969) have now gone (along with the bays at the northern end of the station, now used for car parking), but the main line (electrified in 1991) and the Tees Valley route remain busy.  It is also still possible to travel to Catterick Garrison and Richmond from here, by means of the Arriva North East-operated X26 and X27 buses (which have through National Rail ticketing arrangements). The same company also operated the Sky Express bus service to Durham Tees Valley Airport from the station, but this was withdrawn in January 2009 due to declining demand.

Station masters

Thomas Waldie: 1840–1866
Robert Wood: 1867–1873
Richard Thompson: 1874–1878
James Bell: 1878–1900
Thomas William Smith: 1900–1902 (afterwards station master at Sunderland)
G. H. Stephenson: 1902
George W. T. Laidler: 1902 - 1907
J. Pattinson: 1907
Matthew William Seymour: 1907–1912 (formerly station master at Bishop Auckland, afterwards station master at Boroughbridge)
T. Pearce: 1912–1920
Irving Richard Beeby MBE: 1920–1931
Edwin Weavers: 1932–1941 (formerly station master at Middlesbrough)
Thomas Allen: 1942–1949 (formerly station master at Sunderland)
W. Lake: 1950
W. H. Campbell: 1950–1952 (afterwards station master at Newcastle)
W. J. Thomas: 1952–1956
George Renton: 1956
N. Darby: 1963–????
T. Hutchinson: 1965
S. F. Potts: 1965–????

Accidents and incidents
On 16 November 1910, an express freight train overran signals and was involved in a rear-end collision with another freight train.
On 27 June 1928, a parcels train and an excursion train were involved in a head-on collision. Twenty five people were killed and 45 were injured.
On 11 December 1968, a Newcastle to Kings Cross express train was derailed at the south end of the station after passing a signal at danger.  No-one was hurt.
On 16 February 1977, an express passenger train hauled by Class 55 locomotive 55 008 collided with an empty stock train after failing to stop at Darlington. The guard of the express was slightly injured. The cause of the accident was that the brakes on the carriages had become isolated whilst the train was moving in a freak event. The train had struck an object on the track, which had caused a traction motor cover to come lose. This struck the handle of the brake isolating cock, closing it and thus separating the brakes between the locomotive and train. Following the collision, the train was diverted onto the Tees Valley line, where it was brought to a halt by the operation of the communication cord in one of the carriages.
On 3 October 2009, a  unit, operated by Northern Rail, hit the rear end of a departing National Express East Coast service. Three passengers from the Northern Rail train were taken to hospital with minor injuries.

Facilities

The station is fully staffed; the ticket office is open throughout the week (06:00–20:00/21:00 weekdays, 06:30–19:45 Saturdays, 07:45–20:00 Sundays). There is a waiting room and a first class Lounge on the platform, with the lounge open between 06:00 and 20:00 each day (except Sundays, when it opens at 08:00).  Self-service ticket machines are also provided for use outside the opening hours for the booking office and for collecting pre-paid tickets. Various retail outlets are located in the main buildings, including a coffee shop, grocers and newsagents.  Vending machines, toilets, a photo booth, payphone and cash machines are also provided. Train running information is offered via digital CIS displays, announcements and timetable posters.  Step-free access to all platforms is via ramps from the subway linking the platforms with the main entrance and car park.

Services

Two trains per hour run south to London and north to Newcastle for much of the day with hourly services to Edinburgh Waverley.
The northbound service to Glasgow departs Darlington at 18:09 and the southbound service from Glasgow arrives into Darlington at 10:00.

Certain CrossCountry trains extend beyond Edinburgh to Glasgow Central, Dundee or Aberdeen.

TransPennine Express run two trains per hour in each direction. Northbound; one service runs to Newcastle with a second extending to Edinburgh Waverley. There is also one train early morning service to  via .

Platforms

Darlington railway station has five main platforms:
 Platform 1: This is the main southbound platform, with, in order of frequency, London North Eastern Railway services to York and London King's Cross, CrossCountry services to Reading and Southampton or Birmingham and Plymouth, via York and Leeds, TransPennine Express services to Manchester Piccadilly and Manchester Airport or Liverpool Lime Street, via York and Leeds, and Northern services to Saltburn via Middlesbrough, from Bishop Auckland.
 Platforms 2 and 3: These platforms are south-facing bays used exclusively by Northern services terminating at Darlington from Saltburn and Middlesbrough. Platform 2 is used most frequently.
TransPennine Express trains also terminate in Platforms 2 & 3 when there are delays in order to allow them to run their southbound services back on time.
 Platform 4: This is the main northbound platform, with, in order of frequency, London North Eastern Railway services to Newcastle, Edinburgh and Glasgow, CrossCountry services to Newcastle, Edinburgh and Glasgow, TransPennine Express services to Newcastle and Northern services to Bishop Auckland.
 Platform 4a: This is a southern extension of platform four catering for trains waiting at Darlington such that they can be bypassed by trains stopping at platform 4. It is the only platform that is not under the station roof. It is used predominantly by Northern services for Bishop Auckland. Since the introduction of Class 802, TransPennine Express will use Platform 4a if they need to terminate early whilst using one of these trains due to Platform 2 & 3 not being electrified.

Future

Six platforms
As part of the Tees Valley Metro, two new platforms were to be built on the eastern edge of the main station. The Tees Valley Metro project was cancelled with some parts of the project ultimately followed through in other projects.

With new high speed rail project in the UK, High Speed 2, is planned to run through Darlington once Phase 2b is complete and will run on the existing East Coast Main Line from York and Newcastle. Darlington Station will have two new platforms built for the HS2 trains on the Main Line, as the station is built just off the ECML to allow for freight services to pass through. HS2 Phase 2b is scheduled to start running in late 2033.

References

Sources
Body, G. (1988), PSL Field Guides – Railways of the Eastern Region Volume 2, Patrick Stephens Ltd, Wellingborough,

External links
 
 

Railway stations in the Borough of Darlington
Grade II* listed buildings in County Durham
Grade II* listed railway stations
Former North Eastern Railway (UK) stations
Railway stations in Great Britain opened in 1841
Railway stations in Great Britain closed in 1887
Railway stations in Great Britain opened in 1887
Railway stations served by CrossCountry
Northern franchise railway stations
Railway stations served by TransPennine Express
Railway stations served by London North Eastern Railway
William Bell railway stations
Buildings and structures in Darlington
DfT Category B stations